1975 in professional wrestling describes the year's events in the world of professional wrestling.

List of notable promotions 
These promotions held notable shows in 1975.

Calendar of notable shows

Notable events
promoter Francisco Flores and wrestler Ray Mendoza break away from Empresa Mexicana de Lucha Libre and, along with investor Benjamin Mora Jr., create the Universal Wrestling Association (UWA).

Accomplishments and tournaments

JCP

Awards and honors

Pro Wrestling Illustrated

Championship changes

EMLL

NWA

Births
Date of birth uncertain:
Damian Steele (died in 2009) 
 January 1 - Kid Romeo 
 January 23 - Tito Ortiz 
 January 28 - Shark Boy
 January 30 – Dark Ozz
 February 8 – Shane Shamrock (d. 1998)
 February 18 - Charly Manson 
 March 15 - Lobo 
 March 17 – Test (d. 2009)
 April 12 – Cibernético
 April 14 – Lita
 April 15 - Paul E. Normous (d. 2009)
 May 6 - Germán Figueroa 
 May 8 – Truth Martini
 May 12 - Ricky Ortiz 
 May 15:
La Parkita (d. 2009) 
Espectrito II (d. 2009) 
 May 17 – Alex Wright
 May 22 – Traci Brooks
 June 2 – Chessman
 June 18 - Darren Wyse 
 June 18 - Bam Neely 
 July 3 - Johnny Swinger
 July 9 – Shelton Benjamin
 July 15 – Cherry
 July 17 :
Daffney (died in 2021) 
UltraMantis Black 
Yuki Kondo 
 July 23 – Drago
 July 24 – Torrie Wilson
 July 25 – El Zorro 
 August 2 - Blitzkrieg
 August 17 - Palmer Canon
 August 31 - Takahiro Suwa 
 September 20 - Joel Gertner 
 October 7 – Rhyno
 October 19 - Mrs. Yamaguchi-San 
 November 17 – Ranjin Singh
 November 18 - Taiyo Kea 
 December 9 - Juggernaut 
 December 10 :
 Steve Bradley (died in 2008) 
 Tomohiro Ishii 
 December 17 – Nick Dinsmore
 December 18 – Trish Stratus
 December 31 - Vance Nevada

Debuts
 Uncertain debut date
 Leilani Kai
 Debbie Combs
 Rick McGraw 
 January 15 - Américo Rocca 
 May 2 - Hubert Gallant
 May 13 - Jake Roberts
 July 17 - Lola Gonzales
 November 11 - Rayo de Jalisco Jr.
 December 24 - Dynamite Kid

Retirements
 Argentina Apollo (1960 – 1975)
 Harold Sakata (1949 – 1975)

Deaths
 January 5 - Ray Morgan (announcer), 60
 February 20 – Bobby Shane, 29
 May 28 - Ezzard Charles, 53 
 July 7 - Henri Deglane, 73
 August 19 - Jim Londos, 81

References

 
professional wrestling